William John McGee (27 February 1878 – 28 August 1939) was an Australian rules footballer who played for South Melbourne in the Victorian Football League (VFL).

A centreman and wingman, McGee was a member of Port Melbourne's inaugural Victorian Football Association (VFA) premiership team in 1897 and captained the club from 1900 until 1902.

McGee, who led Port to another premiership in 1901, joined South Melbourne in 1903 and gave them good service in four seasons. He was the South Melbourne captain in 1904 and 1905. In his final VFL season, McGee kicked 17 goals, with four of them coming in a win over Geelong.

He continued at Port Melbourne for five more years from 1907 and finished with 97 VFA games. During his time at the club, McGee had a stint as coach. He was named as a wingman in Port's official 'Team of the Century' when it was announced in 2003.

References

Holmesby, Russell and Main, Jim (2007). The Encyclopedia of AFL Footballers. 7th ed. Melbourne: Bas Publishing.

External links

 Australian Sports Card Collectors Magazine: William McGee

Australian rules footballers from Melbourne
Sydney Swans players
Port Melbourne Football Club players
Port Melbourne Football Club coaches
1878 births
1939 deaths
People from South Melbourne